David Mauricio Bowen-Petterson (born May 20, 1983), better known by his stage name David Rush, is an American rapper from Highland Park, New Jersey. He is perhaps best known for his commercial debut (and only) single as a lead artist, "Shooting Star" in 2008, which had a popular remix featuring American EDM duo LMFAO. He was also featured on the song "Go Girl" by Pitbull and Trina, which was featured on The Boatlift (2007). Rush eventually became a record producer, having produced for Jason Derulo's single "Stupid Love" from the album Talk Dirty (2014).

Career 
In 2007, under the moniker Young Bo$$, Rush scored his first big feature on the song "Go Girl", by fellow American rapper Pitbull, which peaked at No. 83 on the US Billboard Hot 100. Following this, he officially changed his stage name to David Rush and on September 18, 2008, released his debut mixtape, Feel the Rush Vol. 1. The mixtape features his biggest success to date, his commercial debut single, "Shooting Star", which features Pitbull and was produced by AYB. The single charted on the Canadian Hot 100 and also reached the top ten on the US Billboard Rhythmic Top 40 chart. "Shooting Star" was remixed featuring production from LMFAO and vocals from Kevin Rudolf. Rush collaborated with Pitbull again in the making of Pitbull's 2012 album Global Warming, where Rush was featured on a song titled "Everybody Fucks", alongside African-American R&B singer Akon.

Discography

Mixtapes
2008: Feel the Rush Vol. 1
2016: The Alive Project 
2016: GAWD [[Get A Win Daily]]
2017: One Day From The Sun

Singles

Featured singles

References

External links
Official website
 
 

African-American male rappers
Living people
Rappers from New Jersey
East Coast hip hop musicians
African-American record producers
American hip hop record producers
21st-century American rappers
21st-century American male musicians
1983 births
21st-century African-American musicians
20th-century African-American people